Fichtelite is a rare white mineral found in fossilized wood from Bavaria. It crystallizes in the monoclinic crystal system. It is a cyclic hydrocarbon: dimethyl-isopropyl-perhydrophenanthrene, C19H34. It is very soft with a Mohs hardness of 1, the same as talc. Its specific gravity is very low at 1.032, just slightly denser than water.

It was first described in 1841 and named for the location, Fichtelgebirge, Bavaria, Germany. It has been reported from fossilized pine wood from a peat bog and in organic-rich modern marine sediments.

References

Organic minerals
Diterpenes
Monoclinic minerals
Minerals in space group 4
Phenanthrenes
Minerals described in 1841